Radical 73 or radical say meaning "" is one of the 34 Kangxi radicals (214 radicals in total) composed of 4 strokes.

In the Kangxi Dictionary, there are 37 characters (out of 49,030) to be found under this radical.

In the Table of Indexing Chinese Character Components predominantly adopted by Simplified Chinese dictionaries published in mainland China, this radical is merged to radical sun as an associated indexing component.

Evolution

Derived characters

Literature

External links

Unihan Database - U+66F0

073